The 2023 European Ladies' Team Championship takes place 11–15 July at Tawast Golf & Country Club in Hämeenlinna, Finland. It will be the 40th women's golf amateur European Ladies' Team Championship.

Defending champion is team England.

Venue 
The hosting course is situated in Hämeenlinna (Tawastehus in Swedish) in southern Finland about 100 kilometers north of capital city Helsinki. The course, surrounded by woodland and a lake, was designed by architect Reijo Hillberg.

Format 
Each team consists of six players. On the first two days each player plays 18 holes of stroke play each day. The lowest five scores from each team's six players counts to the team total each day.

The eight best teams form flight A, in knock-out match-play over the following three days. The teams are seeded based on their positions after the stroke play. The first placed team is drawn to play the quarter final against the eight placed team, the second against the seventh, the third against the sixth and the fourth against the fifth. Teams are allowed to use six players during the team matches, selecting four of them in the two morning foursome games and five players in to the afternoon single games. Teams knocked out after the quarter finals play one foursome game and four single games in each of their remaining matches. Extra holes are played in games that are all square after 18 holes. However, if the result of the team match is already decided, games are declared halved.

The teams outside the top eight in the stroke-play stage forms flight B, also play knock-out match-play, but with one foursome game and four single games in each match, to decide their final positions.

See also 
 Espirito Santo Trophy – biennial world amateur team golf championship for women organized by the International Golf Federation.
 European Amateur Team Championship – European amateur team golf championship for men organised by the European Golf Association.
 European Ladies Amateur Championship – European amateur individual golf championship for women organised by the European Golf Association.

References

External links 
European Golf Association: Results

European Ladies' Team Championship
Golf tournaments in Finland
International sports competitions hosted by Finland
European Ladies' Team Championship
European Ladies' Team Championship
European Ladies' Team Championship